Sarah Sophia Stothard (1825–1901) was a notable New Zealand teacher and educationalist. She was born in London, London, England in about 1825.

References

1825 births
1901 deaths
New Zealand schoolteachers
English emigrants to New Zealand
19th-century New Zealand people